Mansfield Park is a 1983 British television drama serial, made by the BBC, and adapted from Jane Austen's 1814 novel of the same name. The serial was the first screen adaptation of the novel. Unlike Patricia Rozema's 1999 film, it is faithful to Jane Austen's novel. Jonny Lee Miller, who has a small role as Charles Price in this serial, played Edmund Bertram in Rozema's adaptation.

Set, like all her novels, in contemporary England, Jane Austen's tale of virtue and vice centres on young and impoverished Fanny Price who arrives at the elegant country estate of her uncle, Sir Thomas Bertram. Snubbed by everyone except her cousin Edmund, Fanny begins her long struggle for acceptance by her snobbish relations, who believe wealth automatically means quality. Although Fanny finally wins some respect from the Bertrams, she incurs the displeasure of her uncle by rejecting a marriage proposal from handsome philanderer Henry Crawford because she sees through Crawford's veneer and is unwilling to marry such an unprincipled man. After a period spent at the home of her parents and siblings in Portsmouth, she returns to Mansfield Park because of unfortunate events affecting the Bertram family, and through her support for the family and her adherence to moral principles, her worth is recognised.

Cast
 Katie Durham-Matthews – Young Fanny
 Sylvestra Le Touzel – Fanny Price
 Christopher Villiers – Tom Bertram
 Giles Ashton – Young Tom
 Nicholas Farrell – Edmund Bertram
 Alex Lowe – Young Edmund
 Samantha Bond – Maria Bertram
 Alys Wallbank – Young Maria
 Liz Crowther – Julia Bertram
 Sharon Beare – Young Julia
 Bernard Hepton – Sir Thomas Bertram
 Angela Pleasence – Lady Bertram
 Gillian Martell – Mrs Rushworth
 Jonathan Stephens – Mr Rushworth
 Anna Massey – Mrs Norris
 Peter Finn – Mr Norris
 Robert Burbage – Henry Crawford
 Jackie Smith-Wood – Mary Crawford
 Gorden Kaye – Dr Grant
 Susan Edmonstone – Mrs Grant
 Robin Langford – Mr Yates
 Kenneth Hage – Fiddler
 Allan Hendrick – William Price
 Luke Healy – Young William Price
 Alison Fiske – Mrs Price
 David Buck – Mr Price
 Eryl Maynard – Susan Price
 Claire Simmons – Betsey Price
 Paul Davies-Prowells – Sam Price
 James Campbell – Tom Price
 Jonny Lee Miller – Charles Price
 Vivienne Moore – Rebecca
 Neville Phillips – Baddely
 Norman Mann – Jenkins
 Paul Doust – Curate
 "Snuff" – Pug

Crew
 Derek Bourgeois – Composed and conducted music
 Marion McDougall, Anthony Smith – Production Managers
 Sheelagh Reese – Production Associate
 Yvonne Collins, Sally Dean – Production Assistants
 David Mason, Paul Carney – Assistant Floor Managers
 Peter Netley – Graphic Designer
 Sally Clements – Properties Buyer
 Roger Neal – Vision Control Supervisor
 John Barclay – Vision Mixer
 Trevor Wimlett, Chris Wickham – Cameramen
 Geoff Higgs – Engineering Manager
 Stan Pow – Video-tape Editor
 Daphne Croker – Makeup Designer
 Ian Adley – Costume Designer
 Robin Luxford – Sound
 Bert Robinson – Lighting
 John Bone – Designer
 Betty Willingale – Producer
 David Giles – Director
 John and Mary Holmes – Trained Pug

External links

 
 

BBC television dramas
Television shows based on works by Jane Austen
1980s British drama television series
Television shows set in England
Costume drama television series
1980s British romance television series
1980s British television miniseries
1983 British television series debuts
1983 British television series endings
Television series set in the 19th century
English-language television shows
Works set in country houses
Mansfield Park